Martin Thaler is an Austrian skeleton racer who competed in the early 1990s. He is best known his third place overall finish in the 1991-2 men's Skeleton World Cup.

References
List of men's skeleton World Cup champions since 1987.
Skeletonsport.com profile

Austrian male skeleton racers
Living people
Year of birth missing (living people)
Place of birth missing (living people)